Dr. Mónica Medina is a professor of organismal biology at the Pennsylvania State University. She is known for environmental activism, such as fighting to protect Varadero Reef, and her research on the ecology and evolution of symbiosis by studying the relationships between cnidarian, endosymbiotic dinoflagellates, and other microbes.

Education 
Medina was born and raised Cali, Colombia. She studied Biology at the Universidad de Los Andes before pursuing her Ph.D. in Marine Biology & Fisheries at the University of Miami under the guidance of Patrick Walsh. She described the phylogeny and population genetics of sea hares. She was a post-doctoral fellow at the Marine Biological Laboratory under Mitchell Sogin during which time she explored the phylogeny and cellular complexity of fungi and metazoans.

Career and research 
Medina was a research scientist at the Joint Genome Institute from 2001-2005 and founding faculty member as assistant professor at the University of California, Merced. There, she pioneered the use of genomic approaches to study coral reef science and coral-algal symbiosis for studying bleaching and disease and was awarded a Fulbright Scholarship to work in France, the prestigious Guggenheim Memorial Foundation Award for her excellence in research, and the Presidential Early Career Award for Scientists and Engineers (PECASE) in 2007. 
Upon moving to the Pennsylvania State University, she expanded research to study coral microbiomes. She has published on the population genomic approaches to evolutionary biology and comparative genomics of model cnidarians including Cassiopea, and Orbicella faveolata. She is a founding member of the Global Invertebrate Genomics Alliance (GIGA).
She is part of Penn State's Microbiome Center. She is an invited member of the Council for the Advancement of Science Writing.

She has studied Varadero reef near Cartagena, Colombia, and been an active promoter of community involvement to save the reef. Dr. Medina was a part of the team that made documentary Saving Atlantis, which has been shown across the world in several languages.

Diversity and inclusion in science 
She has promoted underrepresented minorities in STEM through her involvement with activities including the Committee on Equity and Diversity, and in training students, such as National Science Foundation INCLUDES initiatives, the Bridge to PhD for bringing Master's students from University of the Virgin Islands to Penn State.  She was the impetus for the establishment of a Society for the Advancement of Chicanos/Hispanics and Native Americans in Science (SACNAS) chapter at Penn State.  Her lab provides outreach activities to elementary schools about the importance of corals.

References 

Living people
University of Miami alumni
Pennsylvania State University faculty
Colombian women biologists
Colombian women activists
Colombian environmentalists
Colombian academics
Year of birth missing (living people)